Edwin Theodore Mertz (December 6, 1909 – February 1, 1999) was an American chemist and biochemist.

 Mertz was noted for co-discovery of high-lysine corn which significantly increased protein levels in corn and beans.

Life and career 

 1909 born in Missoula, Montana
 1931 B.A with a double major in chemistry and mathematics from the University of Montana
 1933 M.S. from the University of Illinois, Urbana
 1935 Ph.D. from the University of Illinois
 1935-1937 a research biochemist at Armour and Company in Chicago
 1937-1938 an instructor in biochemistry at the University of Illinois
 1937 married Mary Ellen Ruskamp
 1938-1940 a research associate in pathology at the University of Iowa's medical school
 1940-1943 an instructor in agricultural chemistry at the University of Missouri
 1943-1946 a research chemist in an explosives manufacturing factory at Hercules Powder Company
 1946-1950 an assistant professor of agricultural chemistry at Purdue University
 1950-1957 an associate professor of biochemistry at Purdue University
 1957 a professor of biochemistry at Purdue University
 professor emeritus at Purdue University until his death in 1999
 1975 elected to the National Academy of Sciences
 1999 death from complications of pneumonia

Honors and awards
Mertz was a member of the National Academy of Sciences and a recipient of the following awards and distinctions:
1987 Richard Newbury McCoy Award from Purdue University 
1967 John Scott Award in from the City of Philadelphia
1968 Hoblitzelle National Award in the Agricultural Sciences (Texas)
1968 Congressional Medal of the Federal Land Banks in for the discovery of high-lysine corn 
1970 Kenneth A Spencer award from the American Chemical Society
1972 Osborne-Mendell Award from the American Institute of Nutrition
1973 Distinguished Service Award from the University of Montana
1974 Edward W. Browning Award in for "outstanding contributions to mankind in the improvement of the food supply"
1975 Honorary Master Farmer Award of the Prairie Farmer Magazine "for leadership and distinguished service to American Agriculture"
1975 Elected to the National Academy of Sciences
1976 Chemical Pioneer Award from the American Institute of Chemists

Purdue University has established the Edwin T. Mertz Memorial Scholarship in his name.

References

External links 

 John E. Halver, "Edwin Theodore Mertz", Biographical Memoirs of the National Academy of Sciences (2004)

1909 births
1999 deaths
American biochemists
Purdue University faculty
University of Illinois alumni
University of Montana alumni
Members of the United States National Academy of Sciences
People from Missoula, Montana